Liga Malaysia (English: Malaysian League) was an amateur football league in Malaysia that operated from 1982 until 1988. The league was managed by the Football Association of Malaysia. The Malaysian League was established in 1982 after the introduction of a league trophy for the winner of the league stage qualification round for the Malaysia Cup (Malay: Piala Malaysia), with the format first introduced in 1979 where the top eight teams qualified from the league to compete in the knockout stages of the Malaysia Cup.

During its inaugural season in 1982, 16 teams participated in a single-tier league. All 13 state football teams, Kuala Lumpur (known as Federal Territory FA at that time), the Armed Forces, and a representative team from Brunei competed in the league. In 1985, Singapore rejoined the Malaysian football league system and thus competed in the Malaysian League and Malaysia Cup after a temporary spell away, which brought the number of teams up to 17. The league did not operate on a system of promotion and relegation.

The league was the nation's top-tier league until it was succeeded by the formation of Liga Semi-Pro in 1989 which was also managed by the Football Association of Malaysia.

History

Origin 
The concept of an annual competition between the states in Malaysia goes back more than 100 years with the advent of the Malaya Cup in 1921, while league football also existed around that time but was not structured and leagues such as the Selangor Amateur Football League was confined only to clubs in the Kuala Lumpur area. In 1967, the Malaya Cup was renamed as the Malaysia Cup, while state leagues were being run by their respective state football associations that covered wider geographical areas.

In 1979, the FAM introduced a new format for the Malaysia Cup with the introduction of a league stage qualification round for the tournament. The football league competition involved the representative sides of the state football associations, the armed forces and representative sides from Brunei and Singapore. The format was initially intended primarily as a qualifying tournament for the knockout stages of the Malaysia Cup.

League trophy introduction 
It was not until 1982 that a league trophy was introduced to recognise the winners of the preliminary stage as the league champions. Over the years, the league competition gained an important stature in its own right. From 1982 until 1988 the league held an amateur status and continued its purpose as a qualifying round for the Malaysia Cup. It wasn't until 1989 that the league was succeeded by the formation of Liga Semi-Pro and the progression of Malaysian football towards semi-professional status.

1982 season 
In its inaugural season, the league consisted of teams as below.

  Penang (1982 Malaysian League champions) (1st Liga M Title)
  Pahang
  Federal Territory
  Kedah
  Kelantan
  Sarawak
  Johor
  Selangor (1982 Malaysia Cup winners)
  Malacca
  Armed Forces
  Negeri Sembilan
  Perlis
  Terengganu
  Brunei
  Sabah
  Perak

1983 season 
In its second season, the league consisted of teams as below.

  Malacca (1983 Malaysian League champions)
  Penang
  Kelantan
  Kedah
  Pahang (1983 Malaysia Cup winners)
  Selangor
  Brunei
  Federal Territory
  Johor 
  Sabah
  Perlis
  Sarawak
  Negeri Sembilan
  Terengganu
  Perak
  Armed Forces

League Table:-

1.Malacca -  22 PTS (1st Liga M Title)

2.Penang - 21 PTS

3.Kelantan - 18 PTS

4.Kedah - 18 PTS

5.Pahang - 18 PTS

6.Selangor - 18 PTS

7.Brunei - 18 PTS

8.Federal Territory  - 17 PTS

9.Johor  - 17 PTS

10.Sabah  - 16 PTS

11.Perlis  - 13 PTS

12.Sarawak  - 12 PTS

13.Negeri Sembilan  - 11 PTS

14.Terengganu  - 10 PTS

15.Perak  - 6 PTS

16.Armed Forces  - 5 PTS

1984 season 
In its third season, the league consisted of teams as below.

  Selangor (1984 Malaysian League champions and Malaysia Cup winners)
  Pahang
  Penang
  Federal Territory
  Sabah
  Malacca
  Kelantan
  Johor
  Negeri Sembilan
  Armed Forces
  Terengganu
  Perak
  Kedah
  Sarawak
  Brunei
  Perlis

League Table:-

1.Selangor  - 30 PTS (1st Liga M Title)

2.Pahang  - 28 PTS

3.Penang  - 28 PTS

4.Federal Territory  - 25 PTS

5.Sabah  - 24 PTS

6.Malacca  - 24 PTS

7.Kelantan  - 23 PTS

8.Johor  - 23 PTS

9.Negeri Sembilan  - 22 PTS

10.Armed Forces  - 17 PTS

11.Terengganu  - 17 PTS

12.Perak  - 16 PTS

13.Kedah  - 16 PTS

14.Sarawak  - 14 PTS

15.Brunei  - 10 PTS

16.Perlis  - 8 PTS

1985 season 
In its fourth season, the league consisted of teams as below with the inclusion of Singapore. Although, Malacca were suspended from the league season.

  Singapore (1985 Malaysian League champions)
  Johor (1985 Malaysia Cup winners)
  Pahang
  Terengganu
  Federal Territory
  Selangor
  Perlis
  Armed Forces
  Perak
  Penang
  Kedah
  Kelantan
  Sarawak
  Brunei
  Negeri Sembilan
  Sabah
  Malacca

League Table:-

1.Singapore  - 35 PTS (1st Liga M Title)

2.Johor  - 32 PTS

3.Pahang  - 32 PTS

4.Terengganu  - 29 PTS

5.Federal Territory  - 27 PTS

6.Selangor  - 25 PTS

7.Perlis  - 25 PTS

8.Armed Forces  - 24 PTS

9.Perak  - 21 PTS

10.Penang  - 18 PTS

11.Kedah  - 18 PTS

12.Kelantan  - 15 PTS

13.Sarawak  - 13 PTS

14.Brunei  - 12 PTS

15.Negeri Sembilan  - 9 PTS

16.Sabah  - 6 PTS

17.Malacca  - (Suspended)

1986 season 
In its fifth season, the league consisted of teams as below.

  Kuala Lumpur (1986 Malaysian League champions)
  Singapore
  Selangor (1986 Malaysia Cup winners)
  Pahang
  Johor
  Terengganu
  Kedah
  Kelantan
  Sarawak
  Armed Forces
  Penang
  Negeri Sembilan
  Perak
  Malacca
  Perlis
  Brunei
  Sabah

League Table:-

1.Kuala Lumpur  - 38 PTS (1st Liga M Title)

2.Singapore  - 36 PTS

3.Selangor  - 31 PTS

4.Pahang  - 28 PTS

5.Johor  - 25 PTS

6.Terengganu  - 25 PTS

7.Kedah  - 21 PTS

8.Kelantan  - 20 PTS

9.Sarawak  - 18 PTS

10.Armed Forces  - 16 PTS

11.Penang  - 14 PTS

12.Negeri Sembilan  - 14 PTS

13.Perak  - 14 PTS

14.Malacca  - 14 PTS

15.Perlis  - 13 PTS

16.Brunei  - 10 PTS

17.Sabah  - (Withdrew during the campaign)

1987 season 
In its sixth season, the league consisted of teams as below.

  Pahang (1987 Malaysian League champions)
  Kuala Lumpur (1987 Malaysia Cup winners)
  Singapore
  Johor
  Terengganu
  Perlis
  Kelantan
  Kedah
  Selangor
  Sabah
  Perak
  Brunei
  Penang
  Sarawak
  Armed Forces
  Negeri Sembilan
  Malacca

League Table:-

1.Pahang  - 38 PTS (1st Liga M Title)

2.Kuala Lumpur  - 33 PTS

3.Singapore  - 33 PTS

4.Johor  - 32 PTS

5.Terengganu  - 31 PTS

6.Perlis  - 29 PTS

7.Kelantan  - 28 PTS

8.Kedah  - 28 PTS

9.Selangor  - 27 PTS

10.Sabah  - 19 PTS

11.Perak  - 17 PTS

12.Brunei  - 17 PTS

13.Penang  - 17 PTS

14.Sarawak  - 16 PTS

15.Armed Forces  - 11 PTS

16.Negeri Sembilan  - 5 PTS

17.Malacca  - 2 PTS

1988 season 
In its last season, the league consisted of teams as below.

  Kuala Lumpur (1988 Malaysian League champions and Malaysia Cup winners)
  Singapore
  Kelantan
  Kedah
  Penang
  Sarawak
  Johor
  Selangor
  Pahang
  Negeri Sembilan
  Terengganu
  Perak
  Malacca
  Perlis
  Sabah
  Brunei
  Air Forces

League Table:-

1.Kuala Lumpur  - 37 PTS (2nd Liga M Title)

2.Singapore  - 33 PTS

3.Kelantan  - 29 PTS

4.Kedah  - 27 PTS

5.Penang  - 27 PTS

6.Sarawak  - 27 PTS

7.Johor  - 26 PTS

8.Selangor  - 25 PTS

9.Pahang  - 24 PTS

10.Negeri Sembilan  - 23 PTS

11.Terengganu  - 23 PTS

12.Perak  - 21 PTS

13.Malacca  - 14 PTS

14.Perlis  - 13 PTS

15.Sabah  - 11 PTS

16.Brunei  - 9 PTS

17.Air Forces  - 4 PTS

Champions 
Below are the list of Malaysian League champions from 1982 to 1988.

See also 
 Malaysian League
 Liga Semi-Pro
 Liga Perdana (1994–97)

References 

Football leagues in Malaysia
Sports leagues established in 1982
1982 establishments in Malaysia
1988 disestablishments in Malaysia